The 2017–18 Men's England Hockey League season ran from 23 September 2017 until 25 March 2018 with a winter break in December and January for the Indoor season.

Structure
The League consists of 4 different competitions with 10 teams in each competition. The leaders, at the end of the season, from the Premier League compete in a Champions Tournament, whilst the 10th placed top flight team gets relegated and the 9th placed team competes for their place with the winners of the regional conferences.

Premier League

Final standings

Premier League

Results

League Finals Weekend

Semi-finals

Final

Final details
Surbiton
 Scorers: Alan Forsyth 14-F, 16-PS, Gareth Furlong 58-PC / Shootout Scorers: Forsyth 2, Goodfield
 Squad: Harry Gibson (GK); Luke Taylor, Luke Noblett, Jonny Gall, Chris Grassick (Capt.), Arjan Drayton Chana, Zachary Wallace, Alan Forsyth, Brendan Creed, David Goodfield, James Gall. Subs: Sam Spencer, Lewis Prosser, Gareth Furlong, Rob Farrington, Nicky Parkes, Scott Evans. not used: Taylor Seager-Green (GK)
Hampstead & W
 Scorers: Chris Cargo (PC22), Will Calnan (FG28), Matt Guise Brown (PC42) / Shootout Scorers: Calnan, Martin
 Squad: Jamie Legg (gk), Richard Smith, Geoff McCabe, Marc Edwards, Toby Roche (c), Michael Watt, Sam French, Matt Guise Brown, Harry Martin, Kwan Browne, Will Calnan. Subs: Stephen Kelly, Chris Cargo, Rupert Shipperley, Will Byas, Stephen Dowds, Joe Crame. not used: George Ratcliffe (GK)

East Conference

West Conference

North Conference

EH Men's Championship Cup

Quarter-finals

Semi-finals

Final 
(Held at the Lee Valley Hockey and Tennis Centre on 7 May) 

Reading 
Tommy Alexander, Daniel Kyriakides, Adam Miller, Richard Mantell, Ben Boon, Edward Carson, Dan Shingles, Ben Francis, Dale Hutchinson, Tim Atkins, James Royce, Nick Park, Owain Dolan Gray, Lee Morton, Tom Carson, Stuart Loughrey, James Carson, Ciaran O'Connell

Beeston 
Elliot Hibell, Simon Hujwan, Mark Wadsley, Kyle Marshall, Robbie Gleeson, Gareth Griffiths, Joe Sharp, Gareth Andrew, Lucas Garcia Alcalde, Stephen Lawrence, Richard Lawrence, Marius Gemmel, Chris Proctor, Matthew Crookshank, Simon Claris, Navraj Degun

References

2017–18
England
2017 in English sport
2018 in English sport